Visa requirements for Turkmen citizens are administrative entry restrictions by the authorities of other states placed on citizens of Turkmenistan. As of 2 July 2019, Turkmen citizens had visa-free or visa on arrival access to 51 countries and territories, ranking the Turkmen passport 93rd in terms of travel freedom (according to the Henley Passport Index).



Visa requirements map

Changes 
Visa requirements for Turkmen citizens were lifted by Philippines (15 April 2014) and Indonesia (December 2015), Armenia (10 July 2018), Oman (December 2020).

Following countries have reinstated visa requirements for Turkmen citizens: Estonia (1 July 1992), Latvia (1993), Lithuania (1 November 1993), Slovakia (6 May 1994), Bulgaria (1 January 1999), Armenia (1999), Moldova (9 June 1999), Russia (17 July 1999),  Hungary (1 December 1999), Romania (1 July 2000), Belarus (21 July 2000), Czech Republic (22 October 2000), Poland (3 November 2000), Kazakhstan (1 March 2001). Also Kyrgyzstan, Tajikistan,Turkey (14 September 2022), Ukraine and Uzbekistan.

Visa requirements

See also 
 Visa policy of Turkmenistan
 Turkmen passport

References and Notes
References

Notes

Turkmenistan
Foreign relations of Turkmenistan